Tillandsia sprengeliana is a species in the genus Tillandsia. This species is endemic to Brazil.

References

sprengeliana
Flora of Brazil